Teresa Di Loreto (Nocera Inferiore, 26 December 1989) is an Italian Long jumper.

Biography
She became indoor Italian national champion 2012 in long jump in February in Ancona with the measure of 6.17 m.

Personal best
Long jump outdoor: 6.38 m (Brixen, 8 July 2012)
Long jump indoor: 6.21 m (Ancona, 19 February 2011)

Achievements

National titles
1 win in Long jump at the Italian Athletics Indoor Championships (2012)

References

External links
 
 Profile of the athlete at the Gruppo Sportivo Fiamme Azzurre 

1989 births
Athletics competitors of Fiamme Azzurre
Sportspeople from the Province of Salerno
Italian female long jumpers
Living people
People from Nocera Inferiore